Bunting may refer to:

Birds
 Bunting (bird), Emberiza, a group of Old World passerine birds 
 Passerina, a group of birds in the Cardinalidae family, known as the North American buntings 
 Blue bunting, Cyanocompsa parellina
 Lark bunting, Calamospiza melanocorys
 McKay's bunting, Plectrophenax hyperboreus
 Snow bunting, Plectrophenax nivalis

Other uses
 Bunting (animal behavior)
 Bunting (decoration), festive decorations
 Bunting (horse) (1961–1985/86), the name of a Swedish horse
 Bunting (surname), including a list of people with the name
 Bunt (baseball), a batting technique

See also

 Bye, baby Bunting, a nursery rhyme